Samuel Siew (Chinese: 蕭天恩; pinyin: xiāo tiān ēn; born 31 December 1987) is a Malaysian professional football coach and coach educator originally from Kota Bharu, Kelantan. Based in Petaling Jaya, Selangor, he is one of the most accomplished and admired grassroots football coaches in Malaysia. Samuel holds an English FA International Coaching Licence, is a certified coach educator for the Football Association of Malaysia (FAM) and Premier Skills, and is a qualified Asian Football Confederation (AFC) Licence Coach.

Biography

Early life and career 
As a child growing up in the small town of Kota Bharu, Kelantan, Samuel loved playing football. From the age of 7, he dreamt of becoming a footballer. He picked up basketball and squash, too, but it was the team effort in football that brought him out to the field every evening. He is a strong supporter of Manchester United FC and the player he admired most while growing up was David Beckham.

In 2006, Samuel moved to Selangor to attend college at INTI International University & Colleges in Subang Jaya. While studying for a computer science diploma in Network Security, it was there that his football career began. Throughout college, Samuel was captain and player for the college team and WAJA FC, a district club. Together with a friend, he also founded Elastico FC, a semi-professional futsal club based in Subang Jaya for boys under-18. As captain and head coach, he led the team of 30 to train weekly, leading the club to play its first official friendly match in November 2010.

Throughout his football coaching career, Samuel launched a total of five community football and futsal programs, reaching more than 500 children living in government low-cost flats in the Klang Valley such as Kampung Muhibbah, Kampung Pandan and Angsana in USJ1.

As a college student, Samuel was actively involved with football coaching through community projects run by Asian Youth Ambassadors, a non-governmental organization based in Subang Jaya. One of his first roles was to serve as a futsal tournament referee in PPR Kampung Muhibbah, a lower-income housing estate in Puchong, Selangor. It was his experience at Kampung Muhibbah that inspired him to take coaching beyond the community and onto a professional level.

Youth Coaching

Asian Youth Ambassadors (2010–2013) 
Upon graduating from college in 2010, Samuel worked full-time as Sports Coordinator with Asian Youth Ambassadors. He was responsible for coordinating weekly futsal and football programmes for underprivileged youths, teaching football skills as well as developing their character and confidence. Throughout his community work, it was Samuel's belief that impacting young lives is the key to breaking the poverty cycle.

In 2011, Samuel participated in Premier Skills, a community coaching course conducted by the English Premier League and the British Council. At the end of the initiative in 2013, he was awarded the Premier Skills Coach Educator certification. That same year, his grassroots work also brought him to Pekanbaru, Indonesia to conduct soccer clinics for 150 children with Fabio Freitas, a former Brazilian professional goalkeeper.

Dream Village Football Academy (2014–2017) 
By the end of 2013, Sam’s work with the grassroots community in Malaysia had caught the attention of The Football Association (FA) in England. In 2014, he received a full scholarship to train at St George's Park National Football Centre in Staffordshire, England to obtain the FA's International Licence. Samuel was one of two fully sponsored participants from Southeast Asia, training alongside international coaches from 17 other countries.

That same year, he came back to Malaysia to establish Dream Village Football Academy (DVFA), a social enterprise and football academy aimed at "nurturing the dreams of young players" for boys and girls under the age of 16. As co-founder and Technical Director, Samuel's vision for the academy was to develop children and youths in a holistic manner and to nurture local football talents focusing on skills, character and personality.

Throughout his time at DVFA, Samuel trained more than 150 volunteer coaches and reached out to more than 500 children. In 2015, he also led a women’s coaching course in Bandar Sunway, Selangor for 22 aspiring women coaches in Malaysia. Organized by the Premier Skills initiative, the community coaching course aimed to train new coaches and strive for gender equality in football.

In 2017, DVFA under Samuel’s leadership also partnered with German football club Borussia Dortmund (BVB), a top-tier Bundesliga club to organize a 5-day BVB Evonik Soccer Camp, teaching 34 youths aged between 7-14 the ways of the German Cup champions. The camp is part of an effort to forge closer ties between Malaysian football and German football. The DFB-Pokal German Cup was accompanied by the special visit of football legend and 1990 FIFA World Cup winner Karl-Heinz Riedle, who inspired the youths with his story.

Football Management

Football Association of Malaysia (2018–2020) 
In February 2018, Samuel was appointed Head of Grassroots at the Football Association of Malaysia (FAM). He was responsible for strengthening the national grassroots development structures and football pathway for 6 – 12 years old. He is tasked with developing, implementing, and evaluating policies for grassroots football programmes and activities and working alongside key stakeholders and government ministries.

He played a crucial role in restructuring FAM's grassroots through implementing the 'SupaRimau' grassroots brand to increase participation and raise the standards of football academies in the country. Samuel also led the team that developed and implemented the FAM SupaRimau Charter, an evaluation and certification methodology aimed at standardizing the structural process of the Grassroots Academy.

His efforts during his tenure led FAM to two AFC Dream Asia Awards in 2018 and 2019, the AFC Grassroots Bronze membership in 2018 and Silver Charter membership in 2022.

Samuel left FAM at the end of October 2020 to take on a new opportunity in London, England.

Train Effective London (2020–2022) 
Samuel joined Train Effective in London, England in November 2020 as the company's Head of Asia Pacific. He is responsible for expanding and establishing Train Effective as a key player in the digital sports training market in Asia Pacific.

He was later promoted to Head of Operations in June 2021 and is responsible for managing all international football projects and programmes in Europe and the Americas, including on-ground events, budgets, goals and their profitability.

Working with Premier League Football Academy coaches and scouts, Samuel led the London Showcase Camp 2021 and the Miami Showcase Camp 2022. A platform for young players worldwide to showcase their talents in front of scouts and get the highest competitive experience.

Samuel left Train Effective at the end of January 2022 to pursue a new challenge back in Malaysia.

Media 
Since coming to the forefront as a national grassroots football coach, Samuel has appeared on BFM89.9, an independent business radio station in Malaysia to talk about Dream Village Football Academy (DVFA). In the interview, he elaborated on DVFA's business model of being a profitable social enterprise and its efforts to reach out to marginalized youths.

Samuel’s story was also published in the National Newspapers such as China Press newspaper and theSunDaily newspaper.

Awards 
In 2017, Samuel was awarded Malaysia’s Top 10 Most Empowering Young Community Champion 2017 at the Humanitarian Conference 2017 organized by U-Schos. The award aims to recognise young Malaysians who have empowered the under-served community and improved their livelihoods.

References 

Living people
Futsal in Malaysia
Futsal coaches
Malaysian footballers
Malaysian sportspeople of Chinese descent
1987 births
Association footballers not categorized by position
People from Kota Bharu